Régine Veronnet (born 15 November 1929) is a French former foil fencer. She competed at the 1956 and 1960 Summer Olympics.

References

External links
 

1929 births
Possibly living people
Sportspeople from Dijon
French female foil fencers
Olympic fencers of France
Fencers at the 1956 Summer Olympics
Fencers at the 1960 Summer Olympics